Giovanni Battista Lanfranchi (1606 – 3 January 1673) was a Roman Catholic prelate who served as Bishop of Avellino e Frigento (1670–1673).

Biography
Giovanni Battista Lanfranchi was born in Naples, Italy in 1606 and ordained a priest in the Congregation of Clerics Regular of the Divine Providence.  On 30 June 1670, he was appointed during the papacy of Pope Clement X as Bishop of Avellino e Frigento. He served as Bishop of Avellino e Frigento until his death on 3 January 1673.

References

External links and additional sources
 (for Chronology of Bishops) 
 (for Chronology of Bishops) 

1606 births
1673 deaths
17th-century Italian Roman Catholic bishops
Bishops appointed by Pope Clement X
Theatine bishops
Clergy from Naples